Hugo Sabatino is an Argentine-Brazilian physician, scientist and university professor affiliated to the Medical School of the State University of Campinas, in Campinas, State of São Paulo. Sabatino's main specialty is obstetrics. He has contributed to a new form of natural childbirth delivery method using a squatting position. 

Hugo was married twice, resulting in six children.

See also
 Childbirth positions
 Moysés Paciornik

External links
 Davis-Floyd R Changing Childbirth: The Latin American Example Midwifery Today, Volume #84, pp. 9-13, 64-65. Winter 2007

Natural childbirth advocates
Year of birth missing (living people)
Living people
Brazilian obstetricians
Argentine obstetricians
Academic staff of the State University of Campinas
Squatting position